The 2014 IIHF World Championship was hosted by Belarus in its capital, Minsk, held from 9–25 May 2014. Sixteen national teams were competing in two venues, the Minsk-Arena and Chizhovka-Arena. It was the first time Belarus hosted the tournament. The selection of Belarus to host this competition was the subject of much debate, with some politicians in both Europe and the United States calling for the IIHF to move the tournament to another country.

Russia with a mix of NHL and KHL stars (unlike other nations, Russia comprised a squad close to their 2014 Olympic squad) remained undefeated throughout the championship. After losing on home-ice to Finland 1–3 earlier that year during the 2014 Sochi Winter Olympics Quarterfinals, in a rematch, captured the gold medal by defeating Finland 5–2 in the final. Sweden captured the bronze medal with a 3–0 victory over the Czech Republic. Host team Belarus made the playoffs for the first time since 2009, losing to Sweden 3–2 in the quarterfinal. Italy and Kazakhstan were relegated to Division I A. Prior to the championship, Divisions I to III had played their tournaments to establish the rank between teams of lower levels.

The tournament saw a new attendance record for the World Championship, as a total of 640,044 people attended games, surpassing the record set at the 2004 tournament in the Czech Republic, which had 552,097 spectators.

Host selection
On 8 May 2009 in Bern, Switzerland, the Belarusian bid was successful and got 75 votes in the race for hosting the 2014 IIHF World Championship. The application with the slogan "Welcome to the young hockey country" beat out those from Hungary (24 votes), Latvia (3), and Ukraine (3).

The two main venues listed as hosts for the ice hockey teams were Minsk-Arena (capacity around 15000) and Chizhovka-Arena (capacity around 9600). The larger arena was completed and opened in 2010, whereas the construction of the smaller one was completed in 2012.

On 16 January 2012, President Lukashenko announced that any foreigners who wanted to attend the World Championships would not need a visa to enter Belarus or the medical insurance required for entry. The only documentation required was an original or electronic copy of a ticket to a game.

Controversy
The selection of Belarus as hosts caused great controversy and initiated the Minsk2014.No Campaign. On 11 April 2011, United States Senator Dick Durbin and Representative Michael Quigley urged the IIHF to move the World Championship to another location, citing concerns over the authoritarian government of Belarus President Alexander Lukashenko. Lukashenko's alleged human rights violations had resulted in numerous sanctions placed on himself and 157 of his associates by the European Union and the United States. Senator Durbin and Representative Quigley were supported by former Slovak ice hockey player and current Member of the European Parliament Peter Šťastný. According to a 2013 report by the U.S. organisation Freedom House, Belarus was the least democratic country in Europe at the time. The European Parliament called the IIHF to move the venue and demanded the release of all political prisoners as a condition to continue the Championship in Minsk. However, the IIHF remarked that its statutes did not allow it to discriminate on political grounds, and spokespersons for the Latvian and Lithuanian ice hockey federations stated that they had no desire for "mixing politics with sports".

Venues

Rosters

Each team's roster consists of at least 15 skaters (forwards and defencemen) and two goaltenders, and at most 22 skaters and three goaltenders. All 16 participating nations, through the confirmation of their respective national associations, have to submit a roster by the first IIHF directorate meeting.

Officials
The IIHF selected 16 referees and 16 linesmen to work the 2014 IIHF World Championship. They were the following:

Format
Of the 16 teams in the tournament Belarus qualified as host while Kazakhstan and Italy qualified through the 2013 IIHF World Championship Division I, the rest qualified after a top 14 placement at the 2013 IIHF World Championship. The teams are divided into two groups of which the four best from each will advance to the quarter-finals. Here they will meet cross-over as indicated in the section below.

In the group round, points were awarded as follows:

3 points for a win in regulation time (W)
2-point for a team that drew in regulation time but won the following overtime (OTW) or game winning shots (GWS)
1 point for a team that drew and lost the above-mentioned competition (OTL)
0 points for a team that lost in regulation time (L)
If two or more teams finished with an equal number of points in the same group, their standings were determined by the following tiebreaking formula:
Points in games between the tied teams
Goal difference in games between the tied teams
Goals scored in games between the tied teams
Results against the closest best-ranking team outside the original group of tied teams
Results against the next highest ranking team outside the original group of tied teams
Tournament seedings

Final ranking: places 1–4 were determined by the medal games. Other places were determined by playoff positioning, group play positioning in the group, number of points, goal difference, goals scored, and tournament seeding. The two lowest ranking teams overall were relegated to Division I A.

Preliminary round
The schedule was released on 5 September 2013.

All times are local (UTC+3).

Group A

Group B

Playoff round

Quarterfinals

Semifinals

Bronze medal game

Gold medal game

Ranking and statistics

Tournament Awards
Best players selected by the directorate:
Best Goaltender:       Sergei Bobrovsky
Best Defenceman:       Seth Jones
Best Forward:          Viktor Tikhonov
Most Valuable Player:  Pekka Rinne
Media All-Star Team:
Goaltender:  Pekka Rinne
Defence:  Anton Belov,  Seth Jones
Forwards:  Sergei Plotnikov,  Viktor Tikhonov,  Antoine Roussel

Final ranking
The official IIHF final ranking of the tournament:

Scoring leaders
List shows the top skaters sorted by points, then goals.

GP = Games played; G = Goals; A = Assists; Pts = Points; +/− = Plus/minus; PIM = Penalties in minutes; POS = Position
Source: IIHF.com

Leading goaltenders
Only the top ten goaltenders, based on save percentage, who have played at least 40% of their team's minutes, are included in this list.

TOI = Time on ice (minutes:seconds); SA = Shots against; GA = Goals against; GAA = Goals against average; Sv% = Save percentage; SO = Shutouts
Source: IIHF.com

IIHF broadcasting rights

Notes

References

External links

 
IIHF World Championship
1
2014 IIHF World Championship
IIHF World Championship
2014 IIHF World Championship
May 2014 sports events in Europe
2010s in Minsk